Pölöskei is a Hungarian surname. Notable people with the surname include:

Gábor Pölöskei (born 1960), Hungarian football player and manager
Péter Pölöskei (born 1988), Hungarian football player 
Zsolt Pölöskei (born 1991), Hungarian football player 

Hungarian-language surnames